Volodymyr Anatoliyovych Kravchenko (Ukrainian: Володимир Анатолійович Кравченко), is a Ukrainian military officer, lieutenant general, commander of the Ukrainian Armed Forces (from 2019 to 2021). He had served as the Commander of the Operational Command North  from 2017 to 2019.

Biography

Voldoymyr Kravchenko was born in Chernihiv.

Until 2009, he was the commander of the 51st separate mechanized brigade.

From the beginning of the war in Donbas, he headed sector A (Luhansk region), then he led the troops in the ATO and OOS zone.

In 5 December 2014, he became a Major General.

Until 2017, he worked as the chief of staff of the operational command "North" of the ground forces.

That same year, Kravchenko was the commander of the Operational Command North.

On 23 August 2018, he was promoted to Lieutenant General.

After the ATO changed to the OOS, from May to November 2018 he commanded the Operational Tactical Group "North", which is responsible for the contact line in the Luhansk Oblast and on the Svitlodar arc in the Donetsk Oblast.

On March 29, 2019, the Operation Command North signed with the Ukrainian Institute of National Remembrance a memorandum on the establishment of partnership relations and cooperation within the framework of measures for the national-patriotic education of youth and military personnel.

On 5 August 2019, President of Ukraine Volodymyr Zelenskyy appointed Kravechko commander of the Joint Forces Operation.

On 28 July 2021, he was dismissed from the post of commander of the combined forces.

Family

He is married to his wife, Lyubov Kravchenko, and has two sons, Ihor and Olkesandr.

References

Living people
Year of birth missing (living people)
Ukrainian military personnel of the war in Donbas